Francis Patrick Walsh (July 20, 1864 – May 2, 1939) was an American lawyer. Walsh was noted for his advocacy of progressive causes, including Georgism and the land value tax, improved working conditions, better pay for workers, and equal employment opportunities for all, including women. He was appointed to several high-profile committees to investigate and report on working conditions. He was also active in championing independence for Ireland.

Early life
Frank P. Walsh was born in St. Louis, Missouri, on July 20, 1864. At age 10 he dropped out of public school and worked as a telegraph boy in St. Louis. He taught himself stenography, and was considered expert in that craft when he was admitted to the bar in 1889.

Walsh was employed as a clerk in lawyers' offices. In 1885 he moved to Kansas City, Missouri, and began working in the office of noted Kansas City lawyer Gardiner Lathrop (who is famous for co-founding the Kansas City Country Club, among other things). He gained sufficient experience in legal matters in that employment that he passed the bar exam in 1889 and immediately began to practice law in Kansas City, successfully defending Jesse E. James, son of the bandit Jesse James, on an accusation of train robbery in that same year. In 1910, Walsh defended B. Clark Hyde who was accused of murdering his father-in-law Thomas H. Swope.

Career
Walsh was active in Kansas City municipal improvement projects, and was a member of the Kansas City Commercial Club in 1913 when he was nominated by President Woodrow Wilson to head the newly formed Commission on Industrial Relations. Walsh investigated labor-management clashes from 1913 to 1918, and in 1918 was named co-chairman (with ex-President William Howard Taft) of the National War Labor Board.

Walsh was an Irish nationalist who chaired the American Commission on Irish Independence. He fell out of favor with Wilson for pushing for US recognition of the proclaimed Irish Republic.

Walsh's activities in behalf of Irish Independence were analyzed by author Julie E. Manning in her 1989 book, Frank P. Walsh and the Irish Question.

In 1919 Walsh was retained by the National Women's Trade Union League, whose members had been ousted from their jobs as streetcar conductors at the conclusion of World War I. Walsh argued before the War Labor Board that women had the same rights as men to work. At the end of the case the WLB found in favor of the women's organization, and reversed a lower-court ruling on the subject.

The headline from a April 14, 1922 article in The New York Times concerning Walsh's court maneuvers indicates how Walsh was seen by the nation: "FORGET THE LAW, HE URGES". The article describes a legal appeal to the US Railroad Labor Board, to forget the "legal phrases and technicalities of the laws and pay more attention to the humanitarian side in deciding wages for railroad employees . . . Walsh told the board that the wage matter was one far above the law and went down into the deepest moral questions, the structure of society, and even into the fundamental religion . . regardless of the law, the men must have a living wage."

Walsh's activities in behalf of the American Labor Movement were analyzed by author Maria Eucharia Meehan in her book, Frank P. Walsh and the American Labor Movement.

In 1931 Walsh was named Chairman of the New York Power Authority.

Walsh served as the first legal counsel to the Amalgamated Association of Iron and Steel Workers, remaining in that role from 1918 until his death in 1939.

In 1936 Walsh was chairman of the Catholic Citizen's Committee for Ratification of the Federal Child Labor Law.

In 1941 the Walsh family donated the collected files of Walsh to the New York Public Library

For a time, Walsh's secretary in New York was Sarah Lucille Turner, who had been one of the first women elected to the Missouri House of Representatives.

Personal life
Walsh married Katherine O'Flaherty of Kansas City in 1891. They had nine children: Jerome, James, John Frederick, Frank P. Jr., Cecelia, Virginia, Frances, Sarah and Catherine.

Walsh died of a heart attack while walking in front of the New York County Courthouse in New York City on May 2, 1939. He was buried at Mount St. Mary's Cemetery in Kansas City, Missouri on May 6.

Footnotes

Further reading

 Harold Charles Bradley, Frank P. Walsh and Post-War America. PhD dissertation. St. Louis University, 1966.
 Maria Eucharia Meehan, Frank Walsh and the American Labor Movement. PhD dissertation. New York University, 1962.

Missouri lawyers
Lawyers from St. Louis
American Roman Catholics
1864 births
1939 deaths
American activists for Irish independence
Labour lawyers
People from Kansas City, Missouri
Amalgamated Association of Iron and Steel Workers people